Ceste is a small settlement in the Municipality of Rogaška Slatina in eastern Slovenia, close to the border with Croatia. The entire Rogaška Slatina area belongs to the traditional Styria region and is now included in the Savinja Statistical Region.

References

External links
Ceste on Geopedia

Populated places in the Municipality of Rogaška Slatina